Amin Abd al-Hadi (Arabic: أمين عبد الهادي‎; 1897–1967) was the former head of the Supreme Muslim Council. Originally a member of the Ottoman parliament, but was later appointed by the British Mandate authorities to a provisional advisory council which served as a legislative body in Palestine dealing with self-government issues in May 1923. In 1929, he was elected a member of the Supreme Muslim Council. He later succeeded Amin al-Husayni as head of the council after Jordan appointed him the position on December 20, 1948. He moved to Cairo in the late 1960s and died there in 1967.

References

1897 births
1967 deaths
Palestinian politicians
Palestinian Sunni Muslims